Nir County is in Ardabil province, Iran. The capital of the county is the city of Nir. At the 2006 census, the county's population was 23,573 in 5,411 households. The following census in 2011 counted 23,656 people in 6,515 households. At the 2016 census, the county's population was 20,864 in 6,364 households.

Administrative divisions

The population history of Nir County's administrative divisions over three consecutive censuses is shown in the following table. The latest census shows two districts, five rural districts, and two cities.

References

 

Counties of Ardabil Province